Irene Evelyn Bowder Peacock (née Bowder; 27 July 1892 – 13 June 1978) was a South African tennis player.

Bowder Peacock won the doubles title at the 1927 French Championships with Bobbie Heine Miller defeating Peggy Saunders and Phoebe Holcroft Watson in two straight sets. That same tournament she also reached the final of the singles competition which she lost in straight sets to Kea Bouman of the Netherlands. She won the British Indian Championships singles title from 1915 to 1920, the South of England Championships singles title in 1922, and the South African Championships singles title from 1924 to 1926.

At the World Covered Court Championships in 1920 she was a finalist in the doubles and, partnering Francis Fisher, won the mixed doubles title after a walkover in the final against Stanley Doust and Kathleen McKane Godfree. In 1921 she won the mixed doubles at the Queen's Covered Court Championships, again teaming up with Fisher, but lost the final of the singles event to Edith Holman.

She captained the South African women's team that toured Europe in 1927 and together with Heine Miller won the doubles title at the Queen's Club Championships. Bowder Peacock and Heine Miller missed the 1930 Wimbledon Championships due to a scheduling disagreement with the South African Lawn Tennis Union.

Grand Slam finals

Singles (1 runner-up)

Doubles (1 titles, 2 runner-ups)

References

1892 births
1978 deaths
South African female tennis players
British people in colonial India
British emigrants to South Africa
Grand Slam (tennis) champions in women's doubles
Sportspeople from Firozpur
Racket sportspeople from Punjab, India
French Championships (tennis) champions